Farrokhabad (also Romanized as Farrokhābād; also known as Farrokhābād-e Raẕavī) is a village in Qasemabad Rural District, in the Central District of Rafsanjan County, Kerman Province, Iran. At the 2006 census, its population was 73, in 16 families.

References 

Populated places in Rafsanjan County